Nagrijuli is an urban locality and Gram Panchayat (Block) in Baksa district, Assam, India. Nagrijuli is an area with 7,426 hectares, and has a tea estate.

As per the 2011 Census of India, the Nagrijuli area has a total population of 94,137 people including 47,823 males and 46,314 females.

References 

Villages in Baksa district